The 1934 New York Giants season was the franchise's 52nd season. Although they led in the standings for most of the season, the team finished in second place in the National League with a 93–60 record, 2 games behind the St. Louis Cardinals.

On September 6, the Giants were leading the Cardinals by 7 games with an 85–47 record, but went 8–13 the rest of the season to lose the lead on the final day of the season. The Cardinals went 18–5 in the same time span to win the NL pennant. The Giants became the first team in the modern era to lose the pennant after holding a seven-game lead in September.

Regular season

Season standings

Record vs. opponents

Roster

Player stats

Batting

Starters by position 
Note: Pos = Position; G = Games played; AB = At bats; H = Hits; Avg. = Batting average; HR = Home runs; RBI = Runs batted in

Other batters 
Note: G = Games played; AB = At bats; H = Hits; Avg. = Batting average; HR = Home runs; RBI = Runs batted in

Pitching

Starting pitchers 
Note: G = Games pitched; IP = Innings pitched; W = Wins; L = Losses; ERA = Earned run average; SO = Strikeouts

Other pitchers 
Note: G = Games pitched; IP = Innings pitched; W = Wins; L = Losses; ERA = Earned run average; SO = Strikeouts

Relief pitchers 
Note: G = Games pitched; W = Wins; L = Losses; SV = Saves; ERA = Earned run average; SO = Strikeouts

Farm system 

LEAGUE CHAMPIONS: Jacksonville

Notes

References 
1934 New York Giants season at Baseball Reference

New York Giants (NL)
San Francisco Giants seasons
New York Giants season
New York
1930s in Manhattan
Washington Heights, Manhattan